John Patrick Fitzgerald (1815 – 8 January 1897) was a New Zealand doctor, community leader and hospital superintendent. He was born in Carrickmacross, County Monaghan, Ireland on 1815.

References

1815 births
1897 deaths
People from Carrickmacross
New Zealand public health doctors
Irish emigrants to New Zealand (before 1923)
New Zealand hospital administrators